"My Deliverer" is the first single from Mandisa's second album Freedom. It was released on January 27, 2009.

This song was also featured the compilation album WOW Hits 2010.

Song background 
The song is about someone who was helpless, and was watching, waiting, praying, staying down on his/her knees waiting for the Lord to rescue him/her.
On the chorus the lines "Every moment I will give You praise" is basically giving praise to God every day of your life and thanking Him for every blessing.

Personnel 
 Mandisa – lead and backing vocals 
 Christopher Stevens – keyboards, programming, backing vocals 
 Justin York – guitars 
 Bernard Harris – bass
 James Holloway – drums 
 Michelle Swift – backing vocals

Chart performance 
The song rose up to Christian radio, receiving up to 1,000 spins in the first week of release. It debuted at number twenty on the Billboard Hot Christian Songs and climbed to the number nine position, becoming Mandisa's fifth top 10 hit and her first solo top 10 hit since 2007's "Christmas Day".

It peaked at number eight on the Billboard Hot Christian AC chart, becoming her first top 10 hit on the chart since "Lose My Soul".

Charts

Awards

In 2010, the song was nominated for a Dove Award for Pop/Contemporary Recorded Song of the Year at the 41st GMA Dove Awards.

References

Mandisa songs
2009 singles
Sparrow Records singles
2009 songs